Al Francis C. Bichara (born September 17, 1952) is a Filipino politician and former provincial governor of Albay in the Bicol Region of the Philippines from 1995 to 2004 and again from 2016 to 2022.

A civil engineer by profession, Bichara's political career began when he served as mayor of Ligao City from 1986 to 1992. In 1992, Bichara was elected to the House of Representatives, representing the 3rd District of Albay. After one term in the House, Bichara was elected governor of Albay in 1995. He was re-elected as governor in 1998 and 2001.

After the expiration of his third consecutive term as governor in 2004, Bichara was appointed Ambassador to Lebanon by President Gloria Macapagal Arroyo. The 2006 Lebanon War broke out during his tenure as Ambassador, and he drew attention when he threatened to halt the evacuation of Filipinos in Lebanon due to the lack of funds.

In 2007, Bichara returned to the House of Representatives, this time winning election as the Representative from the 2nd District of Albay. In 2016, he ran for governor under the Nacionalista Party and won. In 2019, he once again ran for re-election as governor this time under the PDP–Laban and won.

References

|-

|-

1952 births
Living people
Bicolano politicians
Bicolano people
21st-century Filipino politicians
Filipino people of Lebanese descent
Governors of Albay
Members of the House of Representatives of the Philippines from Albay
Mayors of places in Albay
People from Albay
PDP–Laban politicians